Joel Makower (born 19 February 1952 in Oakland, California) is an American entrepreneur, writer and strategist on sustainable business, clean technology, and green marketing. His work has focused on three principal topics: how companies of all sizes and sectors are integrating environmental thinking into their operations in a way that produces business value; the creation of new companies and markets for clean energy, clean water, and advanced materials; and the strategies and tactics that companies use in order to communicate and market their environmental efforts and leadership, especially to consumers.

Makower has written more than a dozen books, including Strategies for the Green Economy, The Green Consumer, The E-Factor: The Bottom Line Approach to Environmentally Responsible Business and  Beyond the Bottom Line: Putting Social Responsibility to Work for Your Business and the World. In 2010, Makower was awarded the Hutchens Medal by the American Society for Quality. In 2014, he was inducted into the Hall of Fame of the International Society of Sustainability Professionals.

Makower also writes and speaks on the environmental impact of consumerism. Makower writes a blog on these topics, “Two Steps Forward” and contributes to Worldchanging and other blogs on progressive business topics.

References

External links

1952 births
Living people
People associated with solar power
Writers from Oakland, California
Sustainability advocates
University of California, Berkeley alumni
University of Virginia faculty